Stagecoach is a 1966 American Western film, directed by Gordon Douglas between July and September 1965, as a color remake of the Academy Award-winning John Ford 1939 classic black-and-white western Stagecoach. Unlike the original version which listed its ten leading players in order of importance, the major stars are billed in alphabetical order.

Plot
In 1880, a group of strangers in Wyoming Territory boards the east-bound stagecoach from Dry Fork to Cheyenne. The travellers seem ordinary, but many have secrets that they are running from. Among them are Dallas, a prostitute who is being driven out of town; an alcoholic doctor, Doc Boone; pregnant Lucy Mallory who is meeting her cavalry officer husband; and whiskey salesman Samuel Peacock. As the stage sets out, U.S. Cavalry Lieutenant Blanchard announces that Crazy Horse and his Sioux are on the warpath; his small troop will provide an escort part of the way.

Cast

David Humphreys Miller and Norman Rockwell
Also in the cast, playing their sole credited film roles, were two artists, 15th-billed David Humphreys Miller, a 47-year-old western historian who specialized in the culture of the northern Plains Indians and created, among his works, 72 portraits of the survivors of the Battle of the Little Bighorn, and 20th-billed Norman Rockwell, 71 years old, who was engaged to be on the set in order to paint the portraits of the stars and assigned the small role of a town poker player nicknamed Busted Flush. The film's closing-credits sequence features the full-screen inscription, THE CAST AS PAINTED BY NORMAN ROCKWELL, followed by images of each of the ten leading players in the same order as in the opening credits. The portraits were also used in the poster for the film.

Production

Development
Producer Martin Rackin said he became interested in making the movie after he finished a stint as head of production at Paramount. He said he felt the original was dated and modern audiences were not that familiar with it. He also believed Westerns were the "bread and butter of the industry".

A friend of his was buying the rights to the film but was short of money. Rackin stepped in and succeeded in selling the film to Darryl F. Zanuck at Fox.

He hired Gordon Douglas to direct. The men had worked together ten times before and Rackin called him "the most underrated director in Hollywood - he even made Harlow look interesting - a workhouse who keeps helping out when a studio is in trouble and just hasn't had the right material."

Alex Cord was recommended to Rackin by Edmond O'Brien and Richard Quine.

Locations
Filming started July 6, 1965.

A statement in end credits reads: "The Producers express their appreciation to the owners of the Caribou Country Club Ranch at Nederland, Colorado, and to the Park Department of that state, for their cooperation in the making of this film."

Comparison to 1939 film
In parallel with the 1939 version, Ann-Margret, replaces Claire Trevor as the dancehall hostess/prostitute Dallas. Red Buttons, takes the role of Mr. Peacock, the alcohol peddler in a minister's garb, played in 1939 by 8th-billed Donald Meek.Michael Connors portrays the tough gambler, Hatfield, originated by John Carradine.

Alphabetically-fourth Alex Cord is the Ringo Kid, the role that made second-billed John Wayne into a star beyond the quickly made low-budget B-western series which had primarily represented his screen appearances during the 1930s. In fifth place is Bing Crosby, making his final major acting appearance in a theatrical feature, playing the alcoholic Doc Boone, bringing his own interpretation to the character portrayal which won fifth-billed Thomas Mitchell the 1939 Academy Award for Best Supporting Actor.

Sixth-placed Bob Cummings plays the embezzling banker Gatewood, a role assigned in 1939 to 9th-billed Berton Churchill, while seventh in line Van Heflin is the marshal, Curley, played in the original by 7th-billed George Bancroft. The eighth alphabetical position is taken by Slim Pickens as the coach driver, Buck, initially portrayed by third-billed Andy Devine, while ninth place falls to Stefanie Powers as the pregnant Army wife, Lucy Mallory, played in 1939 by the 6th-billed Louise Platt.

At the end of the alphabetical cast, Keenan Wynn, in tenth place, is Luke Plummer, the patriarch of a family of killers, portrayed in 1939 by western star Tom Tyler, billed 11th in the end credits. Finally, 12th-billed supporting player Joseph Hoover portrays the Lieutenant, a character originated by Tim Holt, who was listed 10th in the 1939 credits.

Soundtrack
Opening credits
Wayne Newton
sings "Stagecoach to Cheyenne"
Words and music by
Lee Pockriss and Paul Vance

Uncredited

"Stagecoach Theme (I Will Follow)"
Music by Jerry Goldsmith
Lyrics by Ruth Batchelor
Orchestrated by Harry Betts
Vocal arrangement by Bill Brown
Performed by the Bill Brown Singers
"Stagecoach To Cheyenne"
by Lee Pockriss and Paul Vance
Orchestrated by Shorty Rogers
Vocal arrangement by Bill Brown
Performed by the Bill Brown Singers

Reception

Box Office
According to Fox records, the film needed to earn $6,300,000 in rentals to break even and made $6,950,000, meaning it made a profit.

Critical
Variety summed it up as: "New version of “Stagecoach” is loaded with b.o. appeal. Ten stars repping a wide spectrum of audience interest, an absorbing script about diverse characters thrown together by fate, plus fine direction and performances are all wrapped up in a handsomely mounted Martin Rackin production...Crosby projects eloquently the jaded worldliness of a down-and-outer who still has not lost all self-respect. Much humor evolves from his running gag with Red Buttons, the preacher-dressed and mannered liquor salesman played earlier by the late Donald Meek."

The New York Times review included: "...The action fans may not be short-changed, but only a few of the principals achieve more than surface effects. In a decided departure from the norm, Bing Crosby, as the unshaven, sodden surgeon, is casual, natural, glib and mildly funny. Mr. Heflin is authoritative and taciturn as the marshal intent on keeping his prisoner, the Ringo Kid, from being shot down by the savage Plummers, and Mr. Cord is properly hard, sinewy and determined as that vengeful lone cowhand...But “Stagecoach,” after all, is a horse opera, and the horses, the eye-catching scenery, those dependable hands, and superb sound and fury make it an enjoyable trip most of the way."

Quentin Tarantino is an admirer of the film saying it "can stand proudly alongside the John Ford version" adding that he particularly enjoyed the performances of Bing Crosby, Alex Cord and Mike Connors, as well as the direction of Gordon Douglas.

Film guide reviews
Leonard Maltin's Movie Guide (2014 edition) gave Stagecoach 2½ stars (out of 4), describing it as a "[C]olorful, star-studded Western" which "is OK, but can't hold a candle to the 1939 masterpiece". Maltin also calls it "[O]verlong" and notes that "Wayne Newton sings the title song!". Steven H. Scheuer's Movies on TV (1972–73 edition) also granted 2½ stars (out of 4), characterizing it "[A]n all-star remake of the classic" and evaluating that "[T]he Ford version was better, but the action is still pretty good the second time around". A later edition (1986–87) shortened the capsule review to "[A]n all-star…" and "[A]ction is still pretty good…". A still later edition (1993–1994) retained "[A]n all-star", but revised the second sentence to "[D]oesn't live up to its predecessor, but OK on its own terms".

Assigning 2 stars (out of 5), The Motion Picture Guide (1987) posited that "[W]hy Hollywood insists on remaking classics will always be a puzzle. John Ford's 1939 version of the Haycox story was a genuine western classic and this is a genuine western omelette. The presence of Crosby, in his last acting job in movies, saves the movie from being a total mess. In 1986, a TV version of the picture was done with several country music stars in the leads, as well as Liz Ashley and Anthony Newley. It was so awful, it made this movie look good by comparison". Later in its write-up, The Guide opines that "[W]hereas the original had engaging characters and not all that much violence, this one concentrates on bloodletting, the dialog is a failed attempt to be 'adult', and the performances are generally substandard. Norman Rockwell appears briefly. He'd done the excellent portraits of the actors used with the end credit and they rewarded him with a role in the picture, his first and only. Wayne Newton sings 'Stagecoach to Cheyenne' (Lee Pockriss and Paul Vance). It's the kind of song one dislikes upon first hearing and hates upon the second".

VideoHound's Golden Movie Retriever (2011 edition) does not have a separate entry for the 1966 version but, at the end of its write-up for the 1939 classic is the sentence, "Remade miserably with [sic] in 1966 and again—why?—as a TV movie in 1986".

Among British references, TimeOut Film Guide critic Paul Taylor advised to "[L]ook again at the credits before you're tempted: this is the witless remake of Ford's classic, with neither colour nor Cord anything like adequate recompense for Bert Glennon's dusty monochrome or Wayne's early strut as the Ringo Kid" (from 2009 edition). Leslie Halliwell in his Film Guide (5th edition, 1985) felt even less charitable, denigrating it as an [A]bsolutely awful remake of the above; costly but totally spiritless, miscast and uninteresting". Finally, David Shipman in his 1984 Good Film and Video Guide, does not grant it any stars (Shipman's top number is 4), questioning "[Y]ou wonder why they dared – or bothered. In Ford's film (see previous entry), everything works but here almost nothing does". He concludes with "Keenan Wynn plays a bad man waiting for the stage to arrive. His professionalism, and that of Heflin and Crosby, are some consolation".

References

External links

 
 
 
 
 
 Stagecoach at TV Guide (revised form of this 1987 write-up was originally published in The Motion Picture Guide)

1966 films
1966 Western (genre) films
20th Century Fox films
American Western (genre) films
1960s English-language films
Remakes of American films
Films scored by Jerry Goldsmith
Films directed by Gordon Douglas
1960s American films
CinemaScope films